The Salisbury Municipal Incinerator was a waste management system built for handling municipal waste in Salisbury, Maryland, United States. It burned trash at high temperatures, releasing toxic gasses into the atmosphere and the community. In response to increased awareness of environmental impacts, the city demolished the Incinerator and now uses other modern waste management methods.

History 

The Salisbury Municipal Incinerator construction project started in 1949 and was estimated to be fully completed by September 1950. The Incinerator was a three-story structure that cost an estimated $261,000 to build. The project was commissioned due to the need for the city of Salisbury, Maryland to have a method for city-wide waste management. The city incinerator later closed down circa the 1960s. There were initial talks of turning it into a museum. Still, the site was later demolished, and the City of Salisbury Police Department was built there. The site was located on Delaware Avenue near the intersection with Route 50.

Environmental factors caused by incinerators 
After its closure, Maryland state law required 23 counties to conform to a waste management plan to handle city waste better. Salisbury's solution for this state mandate was to build a landfill to handle city waste. The Environmental Service Commission spearheaded the project. The landfill project, though completed, faced several issues due to heavy rainfall and flooding, so it had to be closed until after the inclement weather. In November 1992, the Salisbury City Council was quoted an estimated cost of $16 million - $20 million to build a more extensive and efficient landfill. Waste materials dumped into landfills release toxic gasses such as methane, ammonia, sulfides ,and carbon dioxide, which can contribute to climate change. In 1963, the clean air act initiated the development of a national program to reduce air pollution and protect people's public health and welfare. The 1967 Clean Air Act permitted the enforcement of regulations that impacted waste management services like the Salisbury Municipal incinerator.

Present day 

The Wicomico County, Maryland Solid Waste Division is now a complex that houses buildings of various functions to enable equipment storage and a physical workplace for employees. Sixty employees work at the landfill to run its day-to-day operations, including landfill, dredging operations, and recycling. To efficiently manage daily operations, the workers utilize 85 pieces of equipment to complete daily tasks. For utmost efficiency, some of the work is contracted out when necessary. In partnership with Ingenco Wholesale Power LLC (now Archaea Energy), the Wicomico Solid Waste Division manages its landfill methane emissions by converting it to renewable energy to heat homes and businesses.

References 

Incinerators
Waste management in the United States
Buildings and structures in Maryland
Landfills
Methane
Renewable energy
Recycling